This is a list of people from Cornwall, a county of England in the United Kingdom. Those included are either native Cornish people or others who have been long-term residents. The demonym of Cornwall is Cornish. This list is arranged alphabetically by surname if available.

There is also a list of women in Cornwall and the Isles of Scilly dedicated to the notable women of Cornwall and the Isles of Scilly.

A 
 John Couch Adams (1819–1892), co-discoverer of the planet Neptune
 Michael Adams (born 1971), chess grandmaster
 Dr. Donald Adamson (born 1939), historian and Fellow of the Royal Society of Literature
 Jack Andrew, rugby player, Cornish Pirates prop forward
 Paul Andrew (born 1989), rugby player, brother of Jack Andrew, Cornish Pirates prop forward
 Michael An Gof (Michael Joseph) (died 1497), leader of the Cornish Rebellion of 1497 
 John Arnold (1736–1799), watchmaker and pioneer of the marine chronometer
 Humphrey Arundell (c. 1513–1550), leader of the Cornish Rebellion of 1549
 Thomas Arundell of Wardour Castle (c. 1502–1552), administrator and alleged conspirator, executed 1552
 Candy Atherton (1955–2017), MP for Falmouth and Camborne

B
Steve Baker (born 1971), Conservative politician, Minister of State for Northern Ireland, born St Austell
 Morwenna Banks (born 1961), comedian and actress
 Jonah Barrington (born 1941), squash player
 the Basset family, landowners and tin mining entrepreneurs who owned Tehidy Country Park
 Tom Bawcock, legendary fisherman from Mousehole
 John Betjeman (1906–1984), British Poet Laureate
 William Bickford (1774–1834), inventor of the safety fuse
 Lamorna Birch (1869–1955), artist and member of the Newlyn School
 William Bligh (1754–1817), captain of the ship Bounty
 Thomas Bedford Bolitho (1835–1915), banker and industrialist
 Max Bodilly (born 1994), rugby player Exeter Chiefs full-back/centre
 Thomas Bond (1765–1837), topographer from Looe
 Arthur Boscawen (1862–1939), Anglican priest and horticulturist
 Admiral Edward Boscawen (1711–1761), a naval commander in the Royal Navy known as "Old Dreadnought"
 John Boson (1655–1730), Nicholas Boson (1624–1708), and Thomas Boson (1635–1719), 18th-century writers in the Cornish language
 Maria Branwell (1783–1821), mother of the Brontë sisters
 James Silk Buckingham (1786–1855), author, journalist and traveller
 Barry Bucknell (1912–2003), the original DIY TV presenter, who lived at St Mawes
 W. J. Burley (1914–2002), author of the Wycliffe series of crime novels

C
 Richard Carew (1555–1620), translator and antiquary
 Elizabeth Carne (1817–1873), geologist
 James Carne (1906–1986), Victoria Cross DSO, Lieutenant Colonel of the 1st Gloucestershire Regiment,  in the Korean War
 Joseph Carne (1782–1858), geologist, industrialist and Fellow of the Royal Society
 John Carter (1738–1803), smuggler known as the "King of Prussia", who operated from Prussia Cove
 Charles Causley (1917–2003), poet
 Ollie Chenoweth (born 1992), retired professional football goalkeeper
 Jack Clemo (1916–1994), blind poet and novelist
 William Clift (1775–1849), naturalist and Fellow of the Royal Society
 Joseph Henry Collins (1841–1916), mining engineer, mineralogist and geologist
 Myrna Combellack, academic researcher and writer of Cornish history
 Constantine of Cornwall, Cornish ruler and saint
 William Cookworthy (1705–1780), discoverer of china clay (kaolinite) in Cornwall
 Saint Corentin, missionary to Brittany
 Corineus, the legendary founder of Cornwall in Geoffrey of Monmouth's Historia Regum Britanniae
 Dr Jonathan Couch (1789–1870), naturalist and physician
 Richard Quiller Couch (1816–1863), naturalist
 Luke Cowan-Dickie (born 1993), rugby player Exeter Chiefs and England hooker
 John Kevin Curtice (born 1953), political scientist

D
 Nick Darke (1948–2005), playwright
 Frederick Hamilton Davey (1868–1915), botanist
 Grenville Davey (1961–2022), artist, Turner Prize winner in 1992
 Sir Humphry Davy (1778–1829), scientist, inventor and president of the Royal Society
 Jamie Day (born 1986), footballer
 Anne Dowriche (before 1560 – after 1613), historian, poet and protestant writer
 Samuel Drew (1765–1833), Methodist theologian
 Daphne du Maurier (1907–1989), novelist
 Edwin Dunkin (1821–1898), FRS, president of the Royal Astronomical Society and the Royal Institution of Cornwall
 Herbert Dyer (1898–1974), coppersmith

E
 Richard Edmonds (1801–1886), geologist and antiquary
 John Passmore Edwards (1823–1911), Chartist and philanthropist
 Joseph Antonio Emidy (1775–1835), black composer who lived in Truro
 Enys family of Enys in Cornwall, includes many landowners, MPs and public officials
 Matthew Etherington (born 1981), professional footballer who played in two FA Cup finals with two different teams, West Ham United and Stoke City

F
 John Pascoe Fawkner (1792–1869), early Australian pioneer, businessman and politician of Melbourne, Australia.
 Bob Fitzsimmons (1863–1917), world champion bare knuckle fighter
 Thomas Flamank (died 1497), leader of the Cornish Rebellion of 1497
 Mick Fleetwood (born 1947), drummer
 Samuel Foote (1720–1777), dramatist
 Stanhope Forbes (1857–1947), artist and member of the Newlyn School
 Robert Were Fox the Elder (1754–1818), Quaker and businessman
 Robert Were Fox (1789–1877), FRS, geologist

G 
 Richard Gaisford (born 1972), Good Morning Britain chief correspondent who trained at University College Falmouth
 Susan Elizabeth Gay (1845–1918), chronicler of Falmouth
 Richard Gendall (1924–2017), linguist and musician
 Ken George (born 1947), scholar and Cornish nationalist
 Davies Gilbert (1767–1839), applied mathematician and technocrat, president of the Royal Society
 Helen Glover (born 1986), Olympic gold medal winning rower
 William Golding (1911–1993), novelist
 Julia Goldsworthy (born 1978), former Liberal Democrat Member of Parliament for Falmouth and Camborne
 Gorlois, mythical Duke of Cornwall
 Pete Goss (born 1961), sailor now living in Torpoint
 Andrew Graham (born 1942), Master of Balliol College, Oxford, 2001-2011
 Winston Graham (1908–2003), novelist, author of the Poldark series
 William Gregor (1761–1817), clergyman and scientist, discoverer of titanium
 Francis Gregory (1904-?) was a champion Cornish wrestler in the 1920s and 1930s who won the heavyweight title 9 times in a row and the interceltic title 7 times in a row.  He was champion of Britain in 1934.  He was a famous sportsman, being a professional wrestler and boxer, who played league and union rugby (including for England). He participated in the first televised wrestling match and wrestled Billy Holland in a scene for the film "Lady of Pendower".
 Pascoe Grenfell (1761–1838), businessman and politician
 Richard Grenville (1542–1591), Navy officer
 Captain Thomas Gundry (1818–1888) was a champion  Cornish wrestler in the 1830s and 1840s. His wrestling record comprised at least 25 tournament wins and 5 second placements from tournaments in Cornwall, Devon and London. He was 7 times Cornish champion.
 Goldsworthy Gurney (1793–1875), inventor of limelight

H
 Philip Hancock of St Austell was the World Cornish Wrestling champion in 1884, winning the "open to the world" belt in Penzance. He was known as "Phep" or "Phip" and came from Mullion, Cornwall. He was 5ft 9in and won the champion belt of Devon and Cornwall, wrestling in front of the Prince of Wales. He claimed that he was never thrown or beaten in 28 years in competitions across the UK.
 James Hawes, television director, re-launched Doctor Who 
 Robert Stephen Hawker (1803–1875), Anglican priest and poet, Vicar of Morwenstow
 John Hawkins (1761–1841), geologist, traveller and FRS
 Harrison Hayter (1825–1898), civil engineer
 Tim Heald (1944–2016), author and journalist
 Donald Healey (1898–1988), automotive engineer
 John Hellins ( 1749–1827), FRS, mathematician, curate of Constantine
 Charles Napier Hemy (1841–1917), landscape and seascape artist, of Falmouth
 Barbara Hepworth (1903–1975), sculptress
 Antony Hewish (1924–2021), astronomer
 Robert Peverell Hichens DSO & Bar, DSC & Two Bars (1909–1943), most highly decorated officer of the Royal Navy Volunteer Reserve
 William Robert Hicks (1808–1868), asylum superintendent
 Emily Hobhouse (1860–1926), humanitarian during the Boer War
 Silas Hocking (1850–1935), author and preacher
 E. G. Retallack Hooper (1906–1998), Cornish bard, writer and journalist 
 Roger Hosen (1933–2005), rugby player, born in Mabe, who played rugby for England ten times in the 1960s
 Joseph Hunkin (1887–1950), Bishop of Truro

J
 Jago (born 1979), children's book illustrator
 John of Cornwall (theologian) medieval writer of the Prophecy of Merlin said to be from a lost Cornish language text
 Richard D. James (born 1971), electronica producer who works under pseudonyms including Aphex Twin and AFX
 Loveday Jenkin, Councillor for Crowan and Wendron
 Kenneth Hamilton Jenkin (1900–1980), Cornish historian, especially of Cornish tin mining
 Henry Jenner (1848–1934), scholar and leader of the revival of the Cornish language
 George Birch Jerrard (1804–1863), mathematician
 Charles Alexander Johns (1811–1874), botanist, clergyman and educator 
 Thomas Brown Jordan (1807–1890), engineer
 Richard Jose (1862–1941), singer

K
 Tony Kellow (1952–2011), footballer
 Allin Kempthorne (born 1972), actor
 Kenneth Kendall (1924–2012), newsreader and broadcaster
 Henry Killigrew (–1603), 16th century diplomat and ambassador
Dame Laura Knight (1877–1970), artist and member of the Newlyn School
 Keith Halfacree (born 1965), academic, human geography

L
 Richard Lander (1804–1834), explorer of Africa
 Peter Lanyon (1918–1964), abstract artist
 Walter Langley (1852–1922), artist and a member of the Newlyn School
 Cassandra Latham, contemporary witch and "village wisewoman" of St. Buryan, Cornwall
 John Lawn (1840–1905), gold miner in New Zealand
 John le Carré (1931–2020), novelist
 Bernard Leach (1887–1979), potter who set up a studio pottery in St Ives in the 1920s
 Janet Leach (1918–1997), potter, wife of Bernard Leach
 Charles Lee (1870–1956), novelist
 Michael Loam (1797–1871), inventor of the man engine
 John Lobb (1829–1895), founder of John Lobb Bootmaker.
 Richard Lower (–1691), blood transfusion pioneer
 Benjamin Luxon (born 1937), baritone singer

M
 Jessica Mann (1937–2018), crime writer
 Al Marconi (born 1969), guitarist
 Mark of Cornwall, ruler of Cornwall in the legend of Tristan and Iseult (see also Tristan)
 Archibald Pellow Marshall (1899–1966), politician and judge
 William Marshall (1923–2007), potter for Bernard Leach 
 Nigel Martyn (born 1966), former England footballer
 Steve Massey (born 1958), professional footballer who has played for and managed Cornish teams 
 John Mayow (1641–1679), physiologist
 Rory McGrath (born 1956), comedian
 John Drew Mackenzie (1861–1918), painter and illustrator, started the Newlyn Copper industry
 Kevin Miller (born 1969), footballer who played for Crystal Palace, Birmingham City and Watford
 Chris Morris (born 1963), footballer who played for Glasgow Celtic and Sheffield Wednesday
 Matthew Paul Moyle (1788–1880), meteorologist and mining writer
 David Mudd (1933–2020), Conservative Party MP, local historian and broadcaster
 William Murdoch (1754–1839), engineer, inventor and sometime Cornish resident
 Sheryll Murray (born 1956), MP for South East Cornwall

N
 Robert Morton Nance (1873–1959), scholar and archaeologist
 John Nettles (born 1943), actor
 Sarah Newton (born 1961), Member of Parliament for Falmouth and Truro
 Thandie Newton (born 1972), actress 
 Obed Nicholls (1885–1962), art nouveau coppersmith
 William Nichols (fl. 1758–1780), mariner
 William Noye (1814–1872), Victorian entomologist
 Jack Nowell (born 1993), England rugby union player

O
 William Oliver (1695–1764), FRS, inventor of the Bath Oliver and a founder of the Royal Mineral Water Hospital at Bath
 Alan Opie (born 1945), baritone
 John Opie (1761–1807), portrait painter, the only Cornishman to be buried in St Paul's Cathedral

P
Zoie Palmer (born 1977), actress born in Camborne
Richard Parkyn (1772 - 1855) was a champion Cornish wrestler, known as The Great Parkyn. He was champion of Cornwall in 1806.
Crawford Pasco (1818–1898) Royal Navy officer and Australian police magistrate during the 19th century, son of John Pasco
John Pasco (1774–1853), British Admiral of Royal Navy
Merlin Owen Pasco (1892–1918), New Zealand entomologist
Samuel Pasco (1834–1917), United States Senator from Florida
Francis Polkinghorne Pascoe (1813–1893), Cornish entomologist
James Polkinghorne (1788 – 1851) was a champion Cornish wrestler who had a number of famous contests against Devon fighters, including Flower, Jackman (1816) and Abraham Cann (1826), which drew very large crowds of spectators (c17,000).
Alex Parks (born 1984), singer/songwriter who won Fame Academy in 2003
 Philip Payton (born 1953), historian and Professor of Cornish and Australian Studies
 John Pearce was the Cornish wrestling champion of Cornwall in 1887 and held the title for 6 years.  He won over 24 tournaments in England and the USA. John also claimed to be world Cornish wrestling champion in 1884 and in 1894.
Andrew Pears (1770–1845), soap manufacturer who invented Pears soap
 William Pengelly (1812–1894), geologist and archeologist
 David Penhaligon (1944–1986), Liberal Member of Parliament
 Susan Penhaligon (born 1949), actress and writer
 Dolly Pentreath (1692–1777), fish pedlar who has been described as the last native speaker of the Cornish language
 Saint Petroc, a patron saint of Cornwall
 John Arthur Phillips (1822–1887), FRS, geologist, metallurgist, mining engineer
 Rosamunde Pilcher (1924–2019), novelist
 Saint Piran (or Perran), patron saint of Cornwall and of tin miners
 William Praed (1747–1833), businessman and banker

Q 
 Arthur Quiller-Couch (aka 'Q') (1863–1944), author, academic and literary critic

R

 John Ralfs (1807–1890), botanist
 Rashleigh family merchants and landowners 
 Andy Reed (born 1969), rugby union player who played for Bath RFC and won 18  caps for Scotland
 Rick Rescorla (1939–2001), hero of the Twin Towers terrorist attack of September 11th 2001
 Henry Chidley Reynolds (1849–1925), dairy farmer who started the Anchor brand of butter
 Caroline Righton (born 1958), Radio presenter and newspaper reporter
 Edward Hearle Rodd (1810–1880), ornithologist
 Geoffrey Rowe (1948–2021), Cornish comedian better known as Jethro
 Richard Rowett Cornish American, served in the American Civil War and introduced the beagle to the USA.
 Dr A. L. Rowse, CH (1903–1997), historian, novelist and poet
 Hilda Runciman (1869–1956), MP for St Ives

S
 Sweet Saraya (born 1971), professional wrestler and promoter
 William Scawen (1600–1689), soldier and linguist
 Kristin Scott Thomas (born 1960), actress
 Hugh Scully (1943–2015), television presenter who lives in Truro
 Richard Sharp (born 1938), rugby union footballer who played in the 1960s who captained England and won 14 caps
 Matthew Shepherd (born 1976), rugby player Plymouth Albion scrum-half/full-back
 Tim Smit (born 1954), executive vice-chairman and co-founder of the Eden Project
 Barney Solomon (1883–1952), rugby union player who captained the silver medal winning Great Britain team in the 1908 Olympics
 John Spargo (1876–1966), socialist and scholar
 Matthew Spriggs, professor of archaeology specialising in Southeast Asia and the Pacific
 Howard Spring (1889–1965), novelist
 Emily Stackhouse (1811–1870), botanical artist and plant collector
 Tristan Stephenson (born 1982), mixologist and drinks industry expert
 Brian "Stack" Stevens (1940–2017), born in Godolphin, rugby player who won 25 caps for England

T
 Derek Tangye (1912–1996), writer who wrote the Minack Chronicles
 Nigel Tangye (1909–1988), airman, author and hotelier at Newquay
 Richard Tangye (1833–1906), engineer
 Roger Taylor (born 1949), rock drummer with the group Queen
 Nigel Terry (1945–2015), actor (King Arthur in Excalibur, 1981)
 D. M. Thomas (born 1935), novelist, poet, playwright and translator
 E. V. Thompson (1931–2012), historical novelist
 Mary Ann Tocker (1778–1853), early radical who exposed corruption in the Stannary Courts 1818
 Anthony Tonkin (born 1980), footballer played for Yeovil Town, Cambridge United, Oxford United and Crewe
 Sam Toy (1923–2008), former chairman of the Ford Motor Company, UK
 Sheila Tracy (1934–2014), BBC Radio 2 presenter
 Mike Trebilcock (born 1944), footballer who won the FA Cup in 1966 with Everton
 David Treffry (1926–2000), colonial administrator and international financier
 Giant Tregeagle, lawyer
 Peter Tregloan (born 1957), powerlifter
 Jonathan Trelawny (1650–1721), Anglican bishop and antagonist of James II
 Petroc Trelawny (born 1971), journalist and BBC Radio 3 presenter
 Sir William Trelawny, 6th Baronet ( 1722–1772), MP for West Looe and Governor of Jamaica
 Henry Trengrouse (1772–1854), inventor of a rocket-powered maritime rescue system
 Silvanus Trevail (1851–1903), architect, mayor of Truro and president of the Society of Architects
 Raleigh Trevelyan (1923–2014), author and publisher
 Jonathan Trevethick (1864-1939), New Zealand businessman and politician 
 John Trevisa (fl. 1342–1402 CE), translator and co-author of the first Bible in English and earliest attestation of 1/3rd of words in the English language.
 Richard Trevithick (1771–1833), inventor, engineer and builder of the first steam locomotive
 Joseph Trewavas (1835–1905), able seaman who won the Victoria Cross
 Elizabeth Trewinnard (born before 1525 – died after 1587), Lady Killigrew, aristocrat who was convicted of piracy during the reign of Queen Elizabeth I
 Tristan, hero of the Tristan and Iseult legend, nephew of Mark of Cornwall
 Henry Scott Tuke (1858–1929), artist, photographer and impressionist painter

V
 John Verran (1856–1932), Premier of South Australia
 Phil Vickery (born 1976), England rugby player
 Andrew Vivian (1759–1842), Trevithick's cousin and collaborator, and captain of Dolcoath Mine

W
William Wagstaff, ornithologist and naturalist
 Alfred Wallis (1855–1942), Cornish fisherman and artist
 Samuel Wallis (1728–1795), explorer of the Pacific
 Williams family of Caerhays and Burncoose, landowners and entrepreneurs
 Patrick Woodroffe (1940–2014), fantasy artist
 Edward Woodward (1930–2009), actor who spent his last years at his home in Hawker's Cove, Cornwall and died in Truro
 Brenda Wootton (1928–1994), folk singer and poet
 Lilian Wyles (1885–1975), first female detective in the British Police Force
 Beatrice Frederika Wright (1910–2003), MP for Bodmin

See also

:Category:Cornwall-related lists
:Category:Cornwall-related biographical lists
Cornish people
List of Cornish Christians
List of Cornish saints

References 

Cornwall-related lists
 
Lists of English people by location
People
Cornwall